Clifton M. Smith, II (born July 21, 1980) is a former American football linebacker. He played college football at Syracuse University.

External links
 Just Sports Stats
 Player Profile on Yahoo Sports.

1980 births
Living people
American football linebackers
Washington Redskins players
Cleveland Browns players
Cologne Centurions (NFL Europe) players
Philadelphia Soul players
Chicago Rush players